Horst Klauck (30 September 1931 – 2004) was a German footballer who played for 1. FC Saarbrücken and the Saarland national team as a goalkeeper.

References

1931 births
2004 deaths
German footballers
Saar footballers
Saarland international footballers
1. FC Saarbrücken players
Association football goalkeepers